Shkodër Airfield  is an airfield located in Shtoj, Shkodër County, Albania.

See also
 List of airports in Albania

References

Airports in Albania
Buildings and structures in Shkodër